Bentley Mitchum (born February 22, 1967) is an American actor who has appeared in about 40 films and TV series, including Sundance grand jury prize winner Ruby in Paradise, The Man in the Moon, The Wonder Years, Conviction, Susie Q, Meatballs 4 and Demonic Toys and Shark Attack.

Bentley also became the first American actor to play lead in an Indian Tamil film, Little John opposite Jyothika.

Personal life
Bentley is the grandson of actor Robert Mitchum, the son of Cindy Davis and actor Christopher Mitchum and the nephew of actor James Mitchum. His acting debut was with them in a TV movie, Promises to Keep, in which the three actors played characters with corresponding relationships. Bentley attended USC and received a Bachelor of Fine Arts in drama. He also started a band called The Velvet Box.

Bentley has two daughters, Allexanne Mitchum, from his marriage to Samra Wolfin, and Carrington Mitchum, from his marriage to Jaime Anstead.

His daughter Allexanne dated Steve Bing.  She died on July 4, 2019, contrary to many false reports, the cause of death is unknown and listed on death certificate as ‘deferred’.

Selected filmography

References

External links
 

1967 births
Living people
American male film actors
American film directors
American male screenwriters
American people of Norwegian descent
Mitchum family
USC School of Dramatic Arts alumni